The Rufe Jordan Unit is a state prison for men located in Pampa, Gray County, Texas, owned by operated by the Texas Department of Criminal Justice.  This facility was opened in October 1992, and has a maximum capacity of 1008 male inmates held at various security levels.

References

Prisons in Texas
Buildings and structures in Gray County, Texas
1992 establishments in Texas